The women's 4×200 metre freestyle relay event and place  at the 2000 Summer Olympics took place on 20 September at the Sydney International Aquatic Centre in Sydney, Australia.

The U.S. women's team established a new Olympic record to defend their title with the help of a sterling anchor leg from Jenny Thompson. Throughout most of the race, the Americans were trailing slightly behind the host nation Australia until Thompson dived into the pool at the final exchange. Thompson held off a sprint battle from Petria Thomas on the final stretch until she touched the wall by seven-tenths of a second (0.70) with a remarkable split of 1:59.35 to deliver the foursome of Samantha Arsenault (1:59.92), Diana Munz (1:59.19), and Lindsay Benko (1:59.34) a gold-medal time in 7:57.80. As the Americans celebrated their triumph in the pool, Thompson picked up her ninth career medal to break a tie with former East Germany's Kristin Otto for the most golds, a total of seven, and to maintain her position as the most successful woman in Olympic history.

After leading three-fourths of the race, Australia's Thomas (2:00.32), Susie O'Neill (1:58.70), Giaan Rooney (1:59.37), and Kirsten Thomson (2:00.13) powered home with a silver in 7:58.52. Meanwhile, Germany's Franziska van Almsick (1:59.51), Antje Buschschulte (2:00.35), and Sara Harstick (2:00.88) helped their teammate Kerstin Kielgass produce a striking anchor of 1:57.90 to capture the bronze medal in 7:58.64. For the first time in Olympic history, all three teams finished the race under an eight-minute barrier.

Outside the club, Romania's Camelia Potec (1:59.10), Simona Păduraru (2:01.52), Ioana Diaconescu (2:01.47), and Beatrice Câșlaru (1:59.54) missed the podium with a fourth-place time of 8:01.63, worthy enough for a national record. Canada (8:02.65), Great Britain (8:03.69), Italy (8:04.68), and France (8:05.99) rounded out the championship finale.

Records
Prior to this competition, the existing world and Olympic records were as follows.

The following new world and Olympic records were set during this competition.

Results

Heats

Final

References

External links
Official Olympic Report

F
4 × 200 metre freestyle relay
2000 in women's swimming
Women's events at the 2000 Summer Olympics